The Taleghan solar hydrogen energy system is a stand-alone photovoltaic–hydrogen demonstration project in Taleghan, Qazvin Province, Iran.  It is developed by the Renewable Energy Organization of Iran (SUNA).

The demonstration project of the Taleghan solar hydrogen energy system was developed in 1996–2005. The initial cost of the system was US$193,563.

Another demonstration project was developed on the site since 2001. It has  a total electrical generation capacity of 200 kW. It produces hydrogen by catalyzing water using solar power. The hydrogen produced is stored in special tanks under pressure. The stored hydrogen can either be used as a fuel on itself or can be converted to electrical energy using Fuel cells, supplying the grid during peak demand hours. The pilot plant is being used to develop hydrogen technologies for larger hydrogen power plants.

See also
 
List of power stations in Iran
Liquid nitrogen economy
Energy development
Lithium economy
Solar fuel
Methanol economy
Vegetable oil economy

References

Hydrogen infrastructure
Renewable energy power stations in Iran
Energy infrastructure completed in 2009